Wilbur Gary Bell (born November 17, 1936), nicknamed Ding Dong, is an American former Major League Baseball pitcher. He pitched from 1958 to 1969 for four teams in his career, but is noted primarily for his time with the Cleveland Indians. During a 12-year baseball career, Bell compiled 121 wins, 1,378 strikeouts, and a 3.68 earned run average in 519 games (233 starts).

In his first two years, Bell compiled a 28–21 record as part of the Cleveland pitching rotation. In 1960, his record was 5–1 after the first month of play, but shoulder problems developed, causing him to win just four of his last 13 decisions. In late August, he was shut down for the remainder of the season. The following year, Bell got off to a slow start with an 0–4 record, and finished with a 12–16 record and a 4.10 ERA in 34 starts. Physical problems as well as issues with pitch control were tabbed as the main reasons for his continued struggles.

In , Bell went 8–5 with five saves and a 2.95 ERA in 58 appearances (seven starts). Despite this, the Indians finished the season under .500 (79–83). Bell was a fastball pitcher early in his career and then developed a slider and curveball.

After 10 seasons with Cleveland, Bell was traded to the Boston Red Sox on June 4, 1967, for Tony Horton and Don Demeter. In his final full season with the Indians, he had gone back to being a starter and went 14–15 with a 3.22 ERA in 40 games (37 starts). He became a part of the Red Sox 1967 World Series hopes, but they lost to the St. Louis Cardinals. Bell pitched in three games (one start), going 0–1 with a 5.06 ERA. After going 2–6 with a 4.70 ERA in 13 games (11 starts) for the Pilots, he was traded to the Chicago White Sox in exchange for Bob Locker on June 8, 1969. Bell was released by the White Sox at the end of the  season.

Tommy John became friends with Bell while both pitchers were with the Indians. John described Bell as "a free-spirited, happy-go-lucky righthanded starter and one of the biggest drinkers on the team." He was a serious competitor with a great sense of humor.

Bell is a current resident of San Antonio, Texas.

References

External links

Retrosheet

1936 births
Living people
Baseball players from San Antonio
Major League Baseball pitchers
Cleveland Indians players
Boston Red Sox players
Seattle Pilots players
Chicago White Sox players
American League All-Stars
Sherbrooke Indians players
Reading Indians players
Vidalia Indians players
Mobile Bears players
San Diego Padres (minor league) players
Hawaii Islanders players